A private is a soldier, usually with the lowest rank in many armies. Soldiers with the rank of Private may be conscripts or they may be professional (career) soldiers.

Asia

Indonesia

In Indonesia, this rank is referred to as Tamtama (specifically Prajurit which means soldier), which is the lowest rank in the Indonesian National Armed Forces and special Police Force. In the Indonesian Army, Indonesian Marine Corps, and Indonesian Air Force, "Private" has three levels, which are: Private (Prajurit Dua), Private First Class (Prajurit Satu), and Master Private (Prajurit Kepala). After this rank, the next promotion is to Corporal.

People's Republic of China
In the People's Liberation Army of the People's Republic of China, Privates and Privates First Class are typically conscripted soldiers serving for a two year period; conscripts who volunteer to continue beyond this period may become professional soldiers: "After the end of induction training, conscripts are awarded the rank of private; in their second year they become privates first class. At the end of two years, conscripts may be demobilized or, if they volunteer, they may be selected to become NCOs. They can also attend a military academy to become officers after passing a test. In effect, the two-year conscription period is a probation period."

Philippines
In the Armed Forces of the Philippines, the rank of Private is the lowest enlisted personnel rank. It is currently being used by the Philippine Army and the Philippine Marine Corps. It stands below the rank of Private first class. It is equivalent to the Airman of the Air Force and the Apprentice Seaman of the Navy and Coast Guard.

Singapore
Once recruits complete their Basic Military Training (BMT) or Basic Rescue Training (BRT), they attain the rank of private (PTE). Privates do not wear ranks on their rank holder. PTEs who performed well are promoted to the rank of Lance Corporal (LCP). The PFC rank is rarely awarded today by the Singapore Armed Forces. All private enlistees can be promoted directly to lance corporal should they meet the minimum qualifying requirements, conduct appraisal and work performance. Recruits who did not complete BMT but completed two years of National Service will be promoted to private.

Commonwealth

Australia
In the Australian Army, a soldier of private rank wears no insignia. Like its British Army counterpart, the Australian Army rank of private (PTE) has other titles, depending on the corps and specification of that service member.

The following alternative ranks are available for privates in the Australian Army:

 Craftsman (CFN) – Royal Australian Electrical and Mechanical Engineers
 Gunner (GNR) – Royal Australian Artillery
 Sapper (SPR) – Royal Australian Engineers;
 Musician (MUSN) – Australian Army Band Corps
 Signalman (SIG) – Royal Australian Corps of Signals
 Trooper (TPR) – Royal Australian Armoured Corps, Australian Army Aviation and the Australian Special Air Service Regiment
Patrolman - Regional Force Surveillance Units

Canada

In the Canadian Armed Forces (CAF), Private is the lowest rank for members who wear the army uniform. It is equivalent to an aggregate of NATO codes OR-1 to OR-3, as opposed to any one specific NATO code. Canadian Forces policy dictates three types of promotions in this rank: promotion (substantive), advancement, and granting of acting rank. There are three rank advancements (fr: échelons) (not to be confused with substantive promotion, though advancement is under the umbrella terminology of promotion) of the Private rank: Private (Recruit), Private (Basic), and Private (Trained), which could arguably unofficially be considered equivalent to NATO codes OR-1, OR-2, and OR-3, respectively.

The two main subtypes of acting promotions are acting/lacking (AL/) qualification and provisional status (A/ (P)) (rare). Acting lacking qualification has pay "promotion" (or, bonus) and seniority reasons only (once promoted substantively, seniority in the new rank of Corporal is the date of promotion to substantive rank, with simultaneous adjustment to the date of granting of (or "promotion to") the acting rank). As long as all other administrative prerequisites are met and the member has 48 months of qualifying service, one gains acting lacking qualification (literally, lacking the prerequisite QL5 qualification to be considered and respected as a substantive Corporal). Once the last prerequisite has been met, substantive promotion occurs (usually, only on paper, without a second ceremony to commemorate the promotion). While still an Acting Lacking Corporal Private (Trained) (AL/Cpl Pte(T)) (or, simply, Acting Lacking Corporal (AL/Cpl), or, informally, Corporal (Cpl)), the Private does not hold any authoritative or legal powers of Corporal rank. Newly granted Acting Lacking Corporals may often erroneously, by virtue of this grant, demand a Private of the same rank to necessarily obey his/her orders. In practice, chain of command (CoC) determines practical seniority by appointed charge. It is not uncommon for a Private (Trained) to be appointed in charge (IC) of his peers, including Acting Lacking Corporals, for a particular task/shift/event/exercise. Therefore, a Private (Recruit) with 5 or more years of seniority, for example (which often occurs, e.g., having entered through an NCM-SEP , completes college before attending basic training, then becomes permanently injured during basic training, works out his/her obligatory service (OS) and is considered for release and, subsequently, waits for said release), holds higher seniority than an Acting Lacking Corporal with 4 years seniority. In this case, the Private (Recruit), without appointment from the chain would theoretically become IC by default, over an Acting Lacking Corporal. A Private (Recruit) who has served for 2 years receives the same pay as a Private (Trained) and a Private (Basic) who has served for 2 years, as pay increments are maxed out after 2 years, ever since the CAF eliminated the Basic and Recruit pay columns for the Private rank from fiscal year 1992 to 1998. Because of the complicated and outdated organizational rank structure of the CAF, the majority of members across the ranks are not aware of the rules and, consequently, do not follow them. No published discussion has been made on separating the rank advancements into independent hierarchical ranks.

All persons holding the rank of Private, without holding a simultaneous granting of acting rank, are referred to as such and the qualifier shown in parentheses is used on all official records. Contemporary practice for medical and other administrative records write Acting Lacking ranks as if they were substantive, for shorthand purposes.

Granting of acting rank while so employed (AWSE or A/WSE) is the last of the subtypes of acting promotions. They are known as theatre promotions, as they can necessarily only occur in-theatre, as they are "limited to designated commanders of operational theatres". However, AWSE promotions are unheard of in the regular junior ranks, as these exclusively exist in the realm of higher officers (usually Major and above) using the grieving process in order to be granted higher pay on top of what they are already making, as well as the realm of precedence after precedence of grievance decisions without ratification into official military policy. Contemporary grievance matters have shifted away from theatre-only matters, as outlined in the career policy, and towards attempting to secure an AWSE temporary rank where the commissioned officer's work period in question, during which there was claimed higher-rank duties, did not occur in-theatre. The Chief of the Defence Staff (CDS), in acting as the Final Authority (FA), quotes the incorrect policy, directing that the Queen's Regulations & Orders (QR&Os) be followed, even though QR&Os have long been superseded/amplified by Canadian Forces Administrative Orders (CFAOs) (in the areas by which they are superseded) (which, in turn, has claimed to have been in the process of being superseded by the Defence Administrative Orders and Directives (DAODs) going on three decades now but have not yet made any new policy on rank structural organization, which make the CFAOs the current de facto ratified policy on promotion). The QR&Os mention a former type of rank labelled acting, which refers to a granting of rank:

(a) for an indefinite period; or

(b) for the period during which the member is filling a position on an establishment for which a rank higher than the member's substantive or temporary rank is authorized.

However, this QR&O acting rank has been superseded by CFAO's provisional status, i.e., A/Cpl (P) and not the separate acting while so employed rank, i.e., AWSE Cpl or Cpl (AWSE) or A/Cpl (WSE), mentioned in the CFAO and never mentioned in the QR&O. Going by CFAO policy, none of the grievers were eligible to be granted AWSE status or pay. In contrast to higher officers, it is quite common for lower ranks to perform duties of ranks one or two ranks above their rank. However, they do not make complaints nor seek compensation for their time in service. They understand and accept that there are already set limits to the number of members in each rank (and trade). AWSE is a mechanism the leaders of the CAF organization take advantage of to secure pay they would otherwise not have been able to receive. It is an increasing contentious issue among the lower ranks that the leader of a professional force continues to approve AWSE promotions, as the CDS admitted himself. He claimed that a "new global CF promotion policy" would be in place "soon". This was stated in 2009.

The air force rank of Aviator (Avr) was formerly called "Private", but this changed in the fiscal year of 2015, when the traditional air force rank insignia and title were replaced in favour of a new rank title the Minister of National Defence introduced back in September 2014, as part of the Government of Canada's efforts in delineating "distinctive service cultures".

Up to 2020, the navy equivalent for Private (Recruit) was Ordinary Seaman (Recruit) (OS (R)); for Private (Basic), Ordinary Seaman (Basic) (OS (B)); and, for Private (Trained), Able Seaman (AB). On 4 September 2020, Commander, Royal Canadian Navy (RCN) announced new English rank designations for its junior ranks, claiming that the English rank titles "DO NOT REFLECT A MODERN AND INCLUSIVE SERVICE" [sic]. The rank equivalent for Private (Recruit) and Private (Basic) is now Sailor Third Class (S3); and, for Private (Trained), Sailor Second Class (S2). The French equivalent for "Sailor" is matelot.

The French-language equivalent for Aviator is aviateur. The rank advancements are useful, as they allow comparability with other militaries and are associated with DAOD 5031-8, Canadian Forces Professional Development's Developmental Periods (DPs), an approximate measure for blocks of career timeframe.
 Private (Recruit) (Pte(R)) / soldat (recrue) (sdt (R)) – a recruit holds this rank advancement from enrolment through to the 14-week recruit training, the Basic Military Qualification (BMQ) Course. This advancement is associated with Developmental Period 1 (DP 1) and QL0.
 Private (Basic) (Pte(B)) / soldat (confirmé) (sdt (C)) – after successful completion of BMQ, a soldier becomes a Private (Basic). This advancement is held through basic environmental training (Basic Military Qualification - Land portion (BMQ-Land) course; Naval Environmental Training Program (NETP); or Basic Air Environmental Qualification (BAEQ) Course), a.k.a. Qualification Level 2 (QL2), and basic occupational training (trade-specific Qualification Level 3 (QL3)). A Private (Basic) is the first advancement to wear the standard rank slip-on (or velcro slip); there is no insignia for this rank. This advancement is associated with Developmental Period 1 (DP 1) and QL3.
 Private (Trained) (Pte(T)) / soldat (formé) (sdt (F)) – A Private (Basic) becomes a Private (Trained) upon attaining QL3 and 30 months of qualifying service, normally before On-the-Job-Training (OJT), a.k.a., Qualification Level 4 (QL4), is attained. If there is a book/package included in the curriculum, the book is also known as "QL3B", usually lasting up to 18 months. A minimum length of post-QL3B training, normally at least a year, is required to complete OJT, before making it onto the training waiting list for QL5, a.k.a. QL5A. However, advancement to Private (Trained) often occurs around the time the member completes his/her OJT or QL3B, depending on trade and service reasons, creating the myth that OJT/QL4 is the MOSID prerequisite for the rank advancement. A Private (Trained) is the only private to wear rank insignia on their rank slip-on (or velcro slip) - a single chevron. The RCAF equivalent rank insignia is a propeller. Private (Trained) and the next rank of Corporal are associated with Developmental Period 2 within the Canadian Forces Professional Development System. Private (Trained) is associated with QL4.
Acting Lacking Corporal Private (Trained) (AL/Cpl Pte (T)) / caporal intérimaire (qualification insuffisante) soldat (formé) (cpl(Int)(QI) sdt (F)) – a private may be granted an acting lacking qualification, once 48 months of qualifying service is met, if the member has not yet attained QL5 by then.

Canadian Army Privates (Trained) may be known by other titles, depending on their personnel branch and their regiment’s tradition:
 Trooper – armoured crewmen in the Royal Canadian Armoured Corps
 Gunner – artillerymen in the Royal Regiment of Canadian Artillery
 Sapper – combat engineers in the Corps of Royal Canadian Engineers
 Signaller (not usually observed) –  communicator research, cyber, and signal operators, and information systems, line, and signal technicians in the Royal Canadian Corps of Signals
 Craftsman (not usually observed) – electronic-optronic, materials, vehicle, and weapons technicians in the Corps of Royal Canadian Electrical and Mechanical Engineers
 Guardsman – Royal Canadian Infantry Corps (RCIC) members of foot guard regiments
 Fusilier –  RCIC members of fusilier regiments
 Rifleman – RCIC members of rifle regiments

Other, according to QR&Os, updated 28 Jun, 2019:

Voltigeur
 Musician
Piper
Drummer
Ranger

South Africa
In the South African Army the lowest enlisted rank is Private. Privates don't wear insignia on their uniforms. In the different corps it is known with different titles.
 Rifleman (Rfn) - South African Infantry Corps
 Signalman (Sgn) - South African Signal Corps
 Gunner (Gnr) - South African Armour Corps and South African Artillery Corps
 Sapper (Spr) - South African Engineer Corps

United Kingdom
In the British Army, a private (Pte) equates to both OR-1 and OR-2 on the NATO scale, although there is no difference in rank. Privates wear no insignia. Many regiments and corps use other distinctive and descriptive names instead of private, some of these ranks have been used for centuries; others are less than 100 years old. In the contemporary British Armed Forces, the army rank of private is broadly equivalent to able seaman in the Royal Navy, aircraftman, leading aircraftman and senior aircraftman in the Royal Air Force, and marine (Mne) or bandsman, as appropriate equivalent rank in the Royal Marines. In the Boys' Brigade the rank of private is used when a boy moves from the junior section to the company section.

Distinctive equivalents for private include:
 Airtrooper (AirTpr) – Army Air Corps
 Bugler (Bgr) – buglers in The Rifles and formerly also in other Rifle regiments
 Craftsman (Cfn) – Royal Electrical and Mechanical Engineers (women as well as men use this rank)
 Drummer (Dmr) – drummers in infantry regiments
 Fusilier (Fus) – Fusilier regiments
 Gunner (Gnr) – Royal Artillery
 Guardsman (Gdsm) – Foot Guards
 Highlander (Hldr) – The Highlanders
 Kingsman (Kgn) – Duke of Lancaster's Regiment
 Musician (Musn) – military bands (formerly if a military band had a Bandmaster, they would be known as Bandsman (Bdsm))
 Piper (Ppr) – bagpipers in Scottish and Irish regiments
 Ranger (Rgr) – Royal Irish Regiment (also previously Royal Irish Rangers)
 Rifleman (Rfn) – Rifle regiments
 Sapper (Spr) – Royal Engineers
 Signaller (Sig) – Royal Corps of Signals (formerly called signalman)
 Trooper (Tpr) – cavalry (Household Cavalry, Royal Armoured Corps, Special Air Service and Honourable Artillery Company)
 Trumpeter (Tptr) – trumpeters in the Household Cavalry (and formerly in all cavalry regiments)

Royal Marines
In  the Corps of Royal Marines, the rank structure follows that of British infantry regiments with the exception that the Royal Marines equivalent of private is Marine (Mne).

During the course of the First World War, some Royal Marines also took the rank of Sapper, this was usually found as part of the Royal Marine Divisional Engineers of the Royal Naval Division.

Europe and Latin America

Belgium 
"corporal". The insignia is a simple black mark or the simplified version of the Royal Military Academy's coat of arms for candidate officers.

Finland

The Finnish equivalent rank is sotamies (literally "war man"), although since 1973 this has been purely a paper term as all infantry troopers were renamed as jääkäri troops, previously reserved only to mobile light infantry. As in the British army, the various branches use different names:

 Infantry – jääkäri ("jaeger")
 Military engineers – pioneeri ("pioneer")
 Signal corps – viestimies ("signaller")
 Cavalry – rakuuna ("dragoon")
 Artillery – tykkimies ("artilleryman")
 Tank corps – panssarimies ("tankman")

In the Finnish Air Force, the basic rank is lentosotamies ("airman"). In the Finnish Navy, the basic rank is matruusi ("seaman") or tykkimies ("artilleryman") in the marine infantry.

Special corps troopers may be referred by their function or unit, such as kaartinjääkäri (Guards jaeger), panssarijääkäri (armored jaeger), laskuvarjojääkäri (paratroop jaeger), rajajääkäri (border jaeger) or rannikkojääkäri (coastal jaeger).

France
In the French army, soldat de seconde classe is the lowest military rank. This rank is also referred to as recrue ("recruit").

Hungary
The name of the lowest rank in the Hungarian army (Magyar Honvédség) is the honvéd which means "homeland defender". The word is also used informally for a soldier in general of any rank (i.e. "our honvéds" or an officer referred as a honvédtiszt, honvéd officer). This is because Hungarian military traditions are strictly defensive, despite the Hungarian army participating in offensives on foreign soil in both world wars. The word honvéd has been in use since the Hungarian Revolution of 1848. The term is not used for soldiers of foreign armies: a foreign soldier with no rank is called közlegény, literally "common lad" or "common man".

Ireland

Private (Pte) (saighdiúr singil in Irish), is the lowest enlisted rank in the Irish Army. Soldiers enlist as recruits then undergo a basic course of instruction. There are three grades of private in the army. After basic training the soldier is upgraded (rather than promoted) from recruit to private 2 star (Pte 2*) (saighdiúr singil, 2 réalta). After more corps-specific training (usually lasting eight weeks) the soldier is upgraded to private 3 star (Pte 3*) (saighdiúr singil, 3 réalta). All are usually just addressed as "private", although before being upgraded, recruits may be addressed as "recruit".

In corps units, the rank designation changes. In the artillery, the rank is known as gunner (Gnr), but usually only after the completion of a gunners' course, and in the cavalry it is known as trooper (Tpr). Communications and Information Services privates are known as signalman or signalwoman. Medical orderlies are sometimes referred to as medic, although this can apply to privates and corporals.

Italy
In the Italian Army  is the lowest military rank.
 is the generic term for private. But in many specialized corps this term is never used, as a more specific, corp related, term is preferred.

Netherlands

In the Royal Netherlands Army, the Landmacht, the equivalent ranks are soldaat (soldier), similar to the original French, with different classes:

 Soldaat der derde klasse (soldier/private 3rd class), for soldiers in Algemene Militaire Opleiding or AMO (General Military Training), with insignia.
 Soldaat der tweede klasse (soldier/private 2nd class), the basic infantry rank, an insignia single striped red band, obtained after AMO but before completion of Initiële Functie Opleiding or IFO (initial job training).
 Soldaat der eerste klasse (soldier/private 1st class), comparable to private first class, with an insignia with two neighbouring striped red bands, obtained automatically a year after completion of IFO.

Depending on where the soldaat serves, he may be deemed a kanonnier (gunner in the artillery), huzaar (hussar in the cavalry) or fuselier (rifleman in the rifles) as well as commando, jager or rijder. There is less differentiation than in other countries between different armed forces. A soldaat can be promoted to korporaal (corporal).

United States

United States Army

In the United States Army, private is used for the two lowest enlisted ranks, just below private first class (E-3) or PFC. The lowest rank is "Private (E-1)" or PVT, sometimes referred to as "recruit", but this rank can also be held by some soldiers after punishment through the Uniform Code of Military Justice, or by soldiers punished under the UCMJ as a demotion until they are discharged. A PVT wears no uniform rank insignia; since the advent of the Army Combat Uniform (ACU), the slang term "fuzzy" has come into vogue, referring to the blank velcro patch area on the ACU where the rank would normally be placed.

The second rank, "Private (E-2)" or PV2, wears a single chevron, known colloquially as "mosquito wings". Advancement to PV2 is automatic after six months' time in service, but may be shortened to four months by a waiver. A person who earned the Eagle Scout award, the Gold Award, or completed at least two years of JROTC may enlist at any time at the rank of PV2. The term of address "private" may be properly applied to any Army soldier E-1 (PV1) to E-3 (PFC). The abbreviation "Pvt" may be used whenever the specific grade of private is immaterial (such as in tables of organization and equipment).

United States Marine Corps

In the United States Marine Corps, private (Pvt) refers only to the lowest enlisted rank, just below private first class.  A Marine Corps private wears no uniform insignia and is sometimes described as having a "slick sleeve" for this reason.  Most new, non-officer Marines begin their military career as a private.  In the Marine Corps, privates first class are not referred to as "private"; it is more appropriate to use either "private first class" or "PFC".

See also
 List of comparative military ranks

References

External links
 U.S. Army Enlisted Rank Insignia – Criteria, Background, and Images

Military ranks
Military ranks of Australia
Military ranks of Canada
Military ranks of Ireland
Military ranks of Singapore
Military ranks of the British Army
Military ranks of the United States Army
United States military enlisted ranks
Military ranks of the United States Marine Corps
Military ranks of the Royal Marines